Pixia is a freeware raster graphics editor program for Windows, created by Isao Maruoka. It was originally designed for the anime/manga community but has also been used in other branches of art. 

Besides the primary Japanese interface, it is also available in English, French, Italian, Spanish, Hungarian, Chinese Simplified, Chinese Traditional, Polish, Korean and German. The program supports multiple layers, transparency effects, standard file formats and a number of RGB file formats including .PSD. The main file extension used by this program is .PXA. The program also has a native support for Wacom tablets, for example the 4.2a version added support for Wacom Bamboo tablets. An advanced version of this software called Phierha with better UI and more functions is also available.

Reception
A CNET Editors' Review in January 2011 called Pixia "one of the most capable and professional Photoshop alternatives we've tried."

See also
Comparison of raster graphics editors

References

External links
 International site

Raster graphics editors
2000 software